The Days Run Away is the second studio album by indie rock band Frankie & The Heartstrings. It was released in June 2013 under Wichita Recordings.

Track list

References

2013 albums
Frankie & the Heartstrings albums
Albums produced by Bernard Butler
Wichita Recordings albums